LOUD an abbreviation for Living Out Ur Dreams, is a 2020 Nigerian high school musical television film directed by Umanu Elijah, and produced by Lemuel Bawa and Honesty Bawa as executive producer. LOUD, is known as the first Nigerian high school musical film.

Living Out Ur Dreams was inspired by the desire to reassure teenagers that their dreams were valid, says the producers. In review for Kemi Filani, Ella Chioma said LOUD was shot with Hollywood standard cinematic equipment, and boosts of quality photos.

Cast
Eucharia Anunobi
Wale Ojo
Bolanle Ninalowo
Jide Kosoko
Timini Egbuson
Sophie Alakija
Abayomi Alvin
Craze Clown
Sydney Talker
Z fanzy TV
Chuddy K
Eddy Oboh
Ebube Obi
Tersy Akpata
Koko Ashley

See also
 List of Nigerian films of 2020

References

External links
 

2020 films
English-language Nigerian films
Musical television films
Romance television films
2020 romantic comedy films
2020s English-language films